USS LST-1050 was a  in the United States Navy during World War II. She was transferred to the Republic of China Navy as ROCS Chung Lien (LST-209).

Construction and career 
LST-1050 was laid down on 23 December 1944 at Dravo Corporation, Pittsburgh, Pennsylvania. Launched on 3 March 1945 and commissioned on 3 April 1945.

Service in United States Navy 
During World War II, LST-537 was assigned to the Asiatic-Pacific theater. She was assigned to occupation and China from 25 September 1945 to 27 January 1947.

She was decommissioned on 29 May 1946 and struck from the Naval Register, 12 March 1948 after she was transferred to the Republic of China.

Service in Republic of China Navy 
The ship was commissioned in 1946 with the name Chung Lien (LST-209).

Chung Lien was decommissioned on 1 September 1990.

Awards 
LST-1050 have earned the following awards:

 China Service Medal (extended)
 American Campaign Medal
 Asiatic-Pacific Campaign Medal
 World War II Victory Medal
 Navy Occupation Service Medal (with Asia clasp)

Citations

Sources 
 
 
 
 

LST-542-class tank landing ships
Ships built in Pittsburgh
World War II amphibious warfare vessels of the United States
LST-542-class tank landing ships of the Republic of China Navy
1945 ships